The teams competing in Group 10 of the 2015 UEFA European Under-21 Championships qualifying competition are France, Belarus, Armenia, Iceland and Kazakhstan.

The ten group winners and the four best second-placed teams advanced to the play-offs.

Standings

Results and fixtures
All times are CEST (UTC+02:00) during summer and CET (UTC+01:00) during winter.

Goalscorers
8 goals
  Emil Atlason

5 goals

  Paul-Georges Ntep de Madiba
  Florian Thauvin

4 goals

  Yassine Benzia
  Hólmbert Friðjónsson

3 goals

  Davit Hakobyan
  Yaya Sanogo
  Roman Murtazayev

2 goals

  Anton Saroka
  Layvin Kurzawa
  Loïck Landre
  Anthony Martial
  Jón Daði Böðvarsson
  Baurzhan Islamkhan

1 goal

  Vardan Bakalyan
  Aghvan Papikyan
  Gagik Poghosyan
  Ashot Sardaryan
  Dzyanis Kavalewski
  Yury Kavalyow
  Pavel Savitskiy
  Maksim Valadzko
  Jordan Ferri
  Sébastien Haller
  Lindsay Rose
  Morgan Sanson
  Kurt Zouma
  Ólafur Karl Finsen
  Kristján Emilsson
  Sverrir Ingi Ingason
  Hjörtur Hermannsson
  Arnór Ingvi Traustason
  Abzal Beisebekov
  Islambek Kuat
  Stanislav Lunin

1 own goal
  Lindsay Rose (playing against Iceland)

References

External links
Standings and fixtures at UEFA.com

Group Z